Timothé Nadim (born 19 October 1997) is a French politician and musician.

Early life 
Nadim was born in Bourgoin Jallieu (Isère) in 1997. In 2009, he started a YouTube channel where he created a series of short movies of humor and action with special effects.

Biography 
In May 2018, he was appointed referent for the youth of the party Act, the Constructive Right for the territory of Nord-Isère. In November 2018, he announced that he became singer for his new French post-grunge band named Breaking Ceremony.

A few days later, he says that he is working on a social network project against school bullying he will soon propose to the French government to replace their current platform. The website should consist of two parts. A first that will be a social network, where child victims can anonymously testify and help each other. The second part will be a section "assistance" with a digital chat communication with professionals, providing information on legal and psychological issues, available without stopping. The "assistance" section will have many resource pages to help victims and parents of victims on topics that have been raised. The idea will be widely relayed by the media, described as innovative and hailed by many child psychologists and associations as breaking all the codes of the current system. In January 2019, he is named referent for the NGO "Respect Zone" for the Rhône-Alpes region.

He is called by ministers Adrien Taquet and Cédric O to present his platform project named S.A.H.S for "Stop the school bullying" to the French government on 17 July 2019. He will meet with member of parliament Agnes Firmin Le Bodo at the National Assembly on 16 July 2019.

In March 2019, he announced to the media that he was diagnosed with Asperger syndrome and that he was a victim of school bullying at the ages of 11 and 14.

External links 
 Timothé Nadim author profile on the Huffington Post

References 

1997 births
Living people
People from Bourgoin-Jallieu
French rock guitarists
French rock singers
Lead guitarists
21st-century French musicians
Post-grunge musicians
21st-century French politicians
Male songwriters
School bullying
People with Asperger syndrome
French male guitarists
Anti-bullying activists